Brier Hill is a hamlet in St. Lawrence County, New York, United States. Brier Hill has a post office with ZIP code 13614.

References

Hamlets in St. Lawrence County, New York
Hamlets in New York (state)